was a town located in Minamitakaki District, Nagasaki Prefecture, Japan.

As of March 31, 2014, the census reports that the town had a population of 9,166 people  and a density of 108.29 people per km². The total area was 50.84 km².

On October 11, 2005, Obama, along with the towns of Aino, Azuma, Chijiwa, Kunimi, Minamikushiyama and Mizuho (all from Minamitakaki District), were merged to create the city of Unzen.

Located at the foot of Mount Unzen, the area is famous for volcanic hot springs (onsen) named Obama Onsen and Unzen Onsen.

References

External links
 Unzen official website  
 Getty Images - people of Obama Onsen hot springs celebrating Barack Obama's election

Dissolved municipalities of Nagasaki Prefecture
2005 disestablishments in Japan